The team show jumping event at the 2020 Summer Olympics took place on 6–7 August 2021 at the Baji Koen. Like all other equestrian events, the jumping competition was open-gender, with both male and female athletes competing in the same division. 60 riders (20 teams of 3) from 20 nations competed. The event was won by team Sweden, which included Peder Fredricson, the silver medalist in the individual event. The United states were second, and Belgium third.

In the final, after two jumpers from every team completed, all eight team were still in the competition, France was leading with two penalties, and Sweden, the United States, and Belgium were all tied for the second with four penalties each. These four teams jumped last. Grégory Wathelet from Belgium received eight penalties, and subsequently McLain Ward for the United States and Fredricson received four penalties each and remained tied for the jump-off. Pénélope Leprevost from France, the defending Olympic champion, was jumping last and was eliminated after her horse twice refused to jump. Thus Belgium became third, and in the jump-off there were no penalties but Sweden were faster and took gold.

Background
This was the 25th appearance of the event, which has been held at every Summer Olympics since its introduction in 1912.

The reigning Olympic Champion is France (Philippe Rozier, Kevin Staut, Roger-Yves Bost, and Pénélope Leprevost). The reigning (2018) World Champion is the United States (Devin Ryan, Adrienne Sternlicht, Laura Kraut, and McLain Ward).

Qualification

A National Olympic Committee (NOC) could enter a team of 3 riders in the team jumping event. A total of 20 team quota places were available. 

The 20 NOCs that qualified teams (and received automatic entries for 3 riders each in the individual competition) were:

 The host, Japan
 6 from the World Equestrian Games: the United States, Sweden, Germany, Switzerland, the Netherlands, and Australia
 3 from the European Jumping Championships: Belgium, Great Britain, and France
 1 each from the Groups C1 and C2 qualification events: Israel (C1) and the Czech Republic (C2, replacing Ukraine, which failed to submit its NOC Certificate of Capability)
 3 from the Pan American Games: Brazil, Mexico, and Argentina
 2 each from the Groups F and G qualification events: Egypt and Morocco (F) and New Zealand and China (G)
 1 at-large place at the Jumping Nations Cup Final: Ireland

Because qualification was complete by the end of the calendar year 2019 (the ranking period ended on December 31, 2019), qualification was unaffected by the COVID-19 pandemic.

Competition format
For the first time since 1992, the show jumping competition format is seeing significant changes. The five-round format (three-round qualifying, two-round final) has been eliminated, with single rounds for each of the qualifying and final. The top 10 teams advance from the qualifying round to the final. The number of team members per NOC has been reduced from four to three, with no drop scores. The score for the team is the sum of the 3 individual scores. In the qualifying round, if one team member did not finish, the team would still be scored based on the 2 finishing members, but would automatically be ranked behind all teams with 3 finishers.

The qualifying round will feature a course with a minimum distance of 500 metres and a maximum of 650 metres. The speed required is 400 metres per minute, though the Technical Delegate may reduce this to 375 metres per minute. There will be between 12 and 14 obstacles, including 1 or 2 double jumps and 1 triple jump, with a maximum of 17 possible jumps (that is, if there are 14 obstacles, only 1 double jump is permitted). The height of obstacles is between 1.40 metres and 1.65 metres, with spread of up to 2 metres (2.20 metres for the triple bar). In general, ties are not broken; however, for the last advancement place, any tie will be broken by combined time. Only if tied on both faults and time will more than 10 teams advance.

Scores do not carry over from the qualifying to the final. The final will feature a course with a minimum distance of 500 metres and a maximum of 700 metres, with the same speed provisions as the qualifying. The number of obstacles will be from 12 to 14, again with 1 or 2 double jumps and 1 triple jump, with a maximum of 18 possible jumps (14 obstacles with 2 doubles and a triple). The height and spread rules remain the same. Ties are generally broken by time (the round is "against the clock"), but a tie on faults for first place will be broken by a jump-off. A tie for second or third place will only be broken by a jump-off if the faults and time are the same.

The jump-off, if necessary, will feature a six-obstacle course.

Schedule
All times are Japan Standard Time (UTC+9)

Results

Qualification
The best 10 teams (including all tied for 10th place) after the team qualifier progress to the team final.

Final

Jump-off

*WD = Withdrawn
*RT = Retired
*EL = Eliminated

References

Team jumping